Fedderson is a surname. Notable people with the surname include:

Don Fedderson (1913–1994), American television executive producer
Yvonne Fedderson (born 1935), American philanthropist and actress, wife of Don

See also
Feddersen